The 20th IIFA Awards (International Indian Film Academy Awards) were held on 18 September 2019. For the first time in the Awards' history, the awards were held in India, Mumbai. The nominees were announced on 2019.

Andhadhun led the ceremony with 13 nominations, followed by Padmaavat and Raazi with 10 nominations each, Sanju with 7 nominations and Badhaai Ho with 6 nominations.

Andhadhun won 6 awards, including Best Director (for Sriram Raghavan), thus becoming the most-awarded film at the ceremony.

Vicky Kaushal received dual nominations at the ceremony, having been nominated for Best Actor for Raazi and Best Supporting Actor for Sanju, winning the latter.

Winners and nominees

Merit Awards

Music Awards

Technical Awards

Special Awards

References

International Indian Film Academy Awards
IIFA awards